Brie is a former commune in the Deux-Sèvres department in the Nouvelle-Aquitaine region in western France. On 1 January 2019, it was merged into the new commune Plaine-et-Vallées.

Geography
The commune of Brie, located north of the department of Deux-Sèvres, is limited to the east by the department of Vienne.

The municipality of Brie is part of the community of communes of Thouarsais and the union of Pays Thouarsais.

History 
On the map of Cassini de Thury showing France between 1756 and 1789, the village is identified as Brye.

By prefectural order of December 4, 1972, effective January 1, 1973, the municipalities of Bilazais, Brie and Noizé merged with Oiron. On 14 February 1983, Brie became independent again (prefectural decree of 11 February 1983).

Policy and administration 

List of successive mayors
Until January 2002 the mayor was Yvon Réau.
From February 2002 and re-elected in 2008 the mayor was Norbert Bonneau PS.

Places and monuments
The church whose stained-glass windows were redone in modern form, which brings a very particular luminosity inside the nave
The old chapel of Sazais.

Demography

See also
Communes of the Deux-Sèvres department

References

Former communes of Deux-Sèvres